Four vessels with the name Providence have served the British East India Company (EIC).

Providence served the EIC between 1637 and 1639.
 , of 250 tons (bm), was launched on the River Thames in 1693. On 27 October 1693 the EIC accepted Providence for charter following a survey. However, the ship is usually referred to as Provident on EIC service.
  was a merchant ship built of teak in India and launched in 1807. She made three voyages for the British East India Company (EIC), on one of which she delivered convicts to New South Wales. She was either lost or broken up in 1833.
  was a merchant ship launched at Lynn that sailed to Bengal and also made two voyages transporting convicts to Australia. She was wrecked in 1828 homeward-bound from St Petersburg, Russia.

Citations

References
 Hackman, Rowan (2001) Ships of the East India Company. (Gravesend, Kent: World Ship Society). 

Ships of the British East India Company
Age of Sail merchant ships
Merchant ships of the United Kingdom